3G-324M is the 3GPP umbrella protocol for video telephony in 3G mobile networks.

The 3G-324M protocol operates over an established circuit switched connection between two
communicating peers. 3G-324M is an umbrella specification to enable conversational multimedia
communication over Circuit Switched (CS) networks and has been adopted by the 3GPP. 3G-324M is based on the ITU-T H.324 specification for multimedia conferencing over Circuit switched networks. 3G-324M is composed of the following sub-protocols:
 ITU-T H.245 for call control
 ITU-T H.223 for bit streams to data packets multiplexer/demultiplexer
 ITU-T H.223 Annex A and B for error handling of low and medium BER detection, correction and concealment
 ITU-T H.324 with Annexes A and C for operating in wireless environment

The 3G-324M specification using the Circuit switched network allows delay sensitive conversational multimedia services such as:
 Videoconferencing for personal and business use
 Multimedia entertainment services
 Telemedicine
 Surveillance
 Live Video Broadcasting– Cable TV On-the-Go
 Video-on-demand (movies, news clips)

3G-324M is agnostic to the actual Circuit switched network that uses it. It can run as easily over UMTS as well as TD-SCDMA networks.

3G-324M operating over a circuit switched channel between two communication peers guarantees the fixed-delay quality of service for multimedia communications. Combining Circuit switched 3G-324M services with packet-based SIP services such as presence can leverage the strength of both networks to enable new types of differentiated and innovative mobile 3G services.

Codecs 

Audio Codec
 GSM Adaptive Multi-Rate, mandatory
 AMR-WB (G.722.2), optional
 ITU-T G.723.1, optional

Video Codec
 ITU-T H.263, mandatory
 ITU-T H.261, optional
 MPEG-4 part 2 simple profile 1 level 0, optional
 ITU-T H.264, optional

References

External links 

 3GPP TS 26.111 - Codec for circuit switched multimedia telephony service; Modifications to H.324
 IMTC 3G-324M AG - Interoperability and testing activity group covering the 3G-324M and H.324 protocol
  3G-324M on Windows Mobile - An interesting article on the integration  of 3G-324M into a Windows Mobile operating system
 Understanding the 3G-324M Spec  - A good explanation on the specification of 3G-324M

Videotelephony
Application layer protocols